East of Broadway is a 1924 American silent comedy film directed by William K. Howard and starring Owen Moore, Marguerite De La Motte, and Mary Carr.

Plot
As described in a review in a film magazine, Peter Mullaney (Moore), a typical boy of the poor section of New York’s East Side, longs to become a policeman. He goes to the training school but is turned down because he is not up to the standard of height, until he demonstrates his prowess by knocking down a big bully. The Commissioner (Lewis) who has high ideas of the necessary mental equipment to improve the force, gives him a chance if he rates high in the written examination. The question that stumps him is “Where is the Tropic of Capricorn.” He answers, in the Bronx. Turned, down, he begs permission to wear the uniform one night, in order not to disappoint his sweetheart Judy (De La Motte). His chance comes when burglars invade a house and shoot his friend Officer Gaffney (Nichols). Peter knocks both out but lands in a hospital himself. When he recovers, the Commissioner pins a policeman’s shield on him and he declares his love for Judy.

Cast

References

Bibliography
 Munden, Kenneth White. The American Film Institute Catalog of Motion Pictures Produced in the United States, Part 1. University of California Press, 1997.

External links

1924 films
1924 comedy films
Silent American comedy films
Films directed by William K. Howard
American silent feature films
1920s English-language films
American black-and-white films
Associated Exhibitors films
1920s American films